Iraj Shahin-Baher is an Iranian politician and the fifty-sixth mayor of Tabriz. He was elected by the Islamic City Council of Tabriz in September 2017 and was inaugurated on same year in Saat City Hall. His tenure in Tabriz Municipality ended in 2021.

References

External links
 

Living people
People from Tabriz
1972 births
Mayors of Tabriz
Iranian city councillors